San Pablo station is a railway station located on the South Main Line in San Pablo, Laguna, Philippines.

History
San Pablo was opened on July 3, 1911 alongside the new section of South Main Line between Malvar, Batangas and San Pablo, Laguna as the line's terminus. It then became an intermediate station when the South Main Line was extended to the south towards Tiaong, Tayabas (now Quezon) in July 1912. A bypass line to College station was completed on August 20, 1923.

References

Philippine National Railways stations
Railway stations in Laguna (province)
Buildings and structures in San Pablo, Laguna